4G is a generation of standards for mobile telecommunication.

4G may also refer to:
 4G or 4GL, a fourth-generation programming language
4G (film), an upcoming Indian film
4G, the production code for the 1975 Doctor Who serial Pyramids of Mars

See also
 G4 (disambiguation)
 3G (disambiguation)
 5G (disambiguation)